Yann Jean Claude Bonato (born March 4, 1972 in Cannes) is a former professional basketball player from France, who won the silver medal at the 2000 Summer Olympics with the senior French Men's National Team.

College career
Bonato played college basketball for the Virginia Commonwealth Rams.

Professional career
After college, Bonato moved back to France, where he played for several different teams, such as CSP Limoges and ASVEL Basket. He was twice elected the Most Valuable French Player in the French League, in 1995 and 1997. He also played two seasons in Italy.

National team career
Bonato played with the senior men's French national basketball team in 92 caps. With France, he played at the 1993 EuroBasket, the 1995 EuroBasket, the 1997 EuroBasket, and the 2000 Summer Olympics, where he won a silver medal.

References

External links
FIBA Profile
FIBA Europe Profile
Euroleague.net Profile
Italian League Profile 
French League Profile 

1972 births
Living people
ASVEL Basket players
Basketball players at the 2000 Summer Olympics
French expatriate basketball people in the United States
French men's basketball players
Limoges CSP players
Medalists at the 2000 Summer Olympics
Olympic basketball players of France
Olympic medalists in basketball
Olympic silver medalists for France
Olympique Antibes basketball players
Pallacanestro Reggiana players
Paris Racing Basket players
Shooting guards
Small forwards
Sportspeople from Cannes
VCU Rams men's basketball players
Victoria Libertas Pallacanestro players